DAIA (Delegación de Asociaciones Israelitas Argentinas) is the umbrella organization of Argentina's Jewish community. As such, it represents the community in official events and conducts all contact with authorities. DAIA is the Argentine affiliate of the Latin American Jewish Congress and World Jewish Congress (WJC), the world-wide umbrella organization of Jewish communities.

DAIA has been strongly involved in fighting antisemitism in Argentina, and claiming for justice in the 1994 AMIA bombing (AMIA being the body that manages the main operations of the Jewish community in Buenos Aires and other cities, namely education, hospitals, retirement houses, and burial).

In 2007, the group reported that antisemitic attacks in Argentina increased by 32% in 2006 in comparison to 2005.

In 2011 the group filed an injunction to stop Google from advertising on 76 "highly discriminatory" websites. DAIA noted, "The common denominator on these sites is the incitement of hate and the call to violence". Indeed, the judge agreed, concluding that "the terms mentioned (in the lawsuit) as well as the results obtained through 'suggested searches' could be described as discriminatory acts and/or at least, incitement and/or encouragement for discrimination".

See also
 World Jewish Congress

References

External links
Official website 
Latin American Jewish Congress

Jewish Argentine history
Jewish organisations based in Argentina
Jews and Judaism in Buenos Aires